Ester Samuel-Cahn (May 16, 1933 – November 20, 2015) was an Israeli statistician and educator. She was a professor emeritus at the Hebrew University of Jerusalem.

Biography 
Samuel-Cahn was born in Oslo, Norway. During the Nazi occupation of Norway, in 1942, her father, a rabbi, was warned that he would be arrested by the Germans. He refused to leave in order to try to support his community. In September, her father was ordered to report to the Gestapo office, where he was questioned and later sent to Auschwitz. Later that year, the Nazis were going to arrest the other Jews in Oslo, however Samuel-Cahn's family were moved by members of the underground, Ingebjørg Sletten-Fosstvedt and Sigrid Helliesen Lund, to safety and later to a refugee camp in neutral Sweden. In order to cross the border, Samuel-Cahn and the rest of her family had to hide in trucks used to transport potatoes. In Stockholm, Samuel-Cahn's family found out that her father had been killed in Auschwitz. In 1946, Samuel-Cahn, her mother and brothers moved to Mandatory Palestine (part of which later became Israel).

Samuel-Cahn received her Ph.D. from Columbia University in 1961. From 1993 to 1995, she was the president of the Israel Statistical Association.
In 1989 she was elected as a Fellow of the American Statistical Association. She was also a fellow of the Norwegian Academy of Science and Letters from 1989, and of the Institute of Mathematical Statistics.

In 2004, Samuel-Cahn won the Israel Prize for her work in statistics. In 2012, she spoke at a memorial ceremony in the Martyrs' Forest in Jerusalem Hills, commemorating Norwegian Jews murdered in the Holocaust and remembering those who helped hide and protect Jews in Norway.

She died in November, 2015.

Selected publications

References 

1933 births
Norwegian Jews
Child refugees
Norwegian refugees
Jews who emigrated to escape Nazism
Refugees in Sweden
Jews in Mandatory Palestine
Columbia University alumni
Women statisticians
Israeli women academics
Norwegian emigrants to Mandatory Palestine
Academic staff of the Hebrew University of Jerusalem
Israel Prize in science and technology recipients
2015 deaths
Fellows of the American Statistical Association
Fellows of the Institute of Mathematical Statistics
Members of the Norwegian Academy of Science and Letters
Israeli statisticians